Thomas Bowes may refer to:

Thomas Bowes (translator), English translator
Thomas Bowes (violinist) (born 1960), English violinist and orchestra leader

See also
Tommy Bowe (born 1984), Irish rugby player
Thomas Lyon-Bowes (disambiguation)